Thomas Carey (29 December 1931 – 23 January 2002) was an American operatic baritone.

Born in Bennettsville, South Carolina, he served in the United States military during the Korean War.

After leaving the service, he studied singing at the Henry Street Settlement and at City College of New York. In 1970, he performed the role of Mel in the world premiere of Michael Tippett's The Knot Garden at the Royal Opera House in London. He appeared in the second London West End revival of Show Boat in the role of Joe, which premiered in 1971. From 1969 until his death of pancreatic cancer in Norman, Oklahoma, he taught on the voice faculty of the University of Oklahoma.

He was married for many years to the contralto Carol Brice, who predeceased him in 1985.

References

1931 births
2002 deaths
City College of New York alumni
American operatic baritones
University of Oklahoma faculty
People from Bennettsville, South Carolina
Singers from South Carolina
American military personnel of the Korean War
Deaths from pancreatic cancer
Deaths from cancer in Oklahoma
20th-century African-American male singers
20th-century American male opera singers
African-American male opera singers